Rose Blumkin (née Gorelick; December 3, 1893 – August 9, 1998) was an American businesswoman who founded the Nebraska Furniture Mart in 1937. Businessman Warren Buffett said of her, "One question I always ask myself in appraising a business is how I would like, assuming I had ample capital and skilled personnel, to compete with it.  I’d rather wrestle grizzlies than compete with Mrs. B and her progeny.  They buy brilliantly, they operate at expense ratios competitors don’t even dream about, and they then pass on to their customers much of the savings.

Her credo, according to her obituary in the New York Times was "Sell cheap, tell the truth, don't cheat nobody."

Early life

Blumkin was born in 1893 as Rosa Gorelick to a Jewish family in Shchedrin, a village near Babruysk in present day Belarus. She was one of eight children of Solomon and Chasya Gorelick. Her father was a rabbi and her mother ran a grocery store. When she was twenty, Rose married Izya (Isadore) Blumkin.

Blumkin immigrated to the United States in 1917. She could not speak English. In 1919, she moved to Omaha, Nebraska, where the Blumkins started a used clothing store.

Career 

Blumkin opened the Nebraska Furniture Mart in 1933, selling used furniture. Known as "Mrs. B.", she was in her mid-40s when she opened the business in the basement of her husband's store with an investment of $500 ($9,171.30 adjusted for inflation in 2022).

Blumkin grew the business to become the largest indoor furniture store in America. This caught the attention of Warren Buffett. In 1983, Buffett's company purchased a 90% share of the Nebraska Furniture Mart for $60 million (~$158 million adjusted for inflation in 2022).

In 1989, six years after selling 90% of her company to Berkshire Hathaway, Blumkin retired, only to come out of retirement in three months to open up a rival store. It was called "Mrs. B's Clearance and Factory Outlet" and was situated directly across the street from the Furniture Mart. It became profitable by 1991.  Buffett acquired the business in 1992. Blumkin continued to be involved in day-to-day operations until shortly before her death at the age of 104.

Recognition 

Blumkin was active as a philanthropist. The Rose Blumkin Performing Arts Center is named for her. She was also a large donor to the Omaha Jewish Community Center. She received honorary degrees from New York University and Creighton University.

Death 

Rose Blumkin died at the age of 104 on August 9, 1998, as a result of cardiac issues and chronic bronchitis

Mrs. Blumkin is buried in the Golden Hill Jewish Cemetery.

References

External links

Mrs. B's Story at the Home Furnishings Hall of Fame website
Three-minute video interview with Rose Blumkin from NBC in 1986
Rose Blumkin Jewish Home

1893 births
1998 deaths
American centenarians
American company founders
American people of Belarusian-Jewish descent
American women business executives
American women company founders
Berkshire Hathaway
Emigrants from the Russian Empire to the United States
Jewish American philanthropists
Women centenarians
20th-century American businesswomen
20th-century American businesspeople
20th-century American Jews